Massasoit Community College is a public community college in Brockton, Massachusetts. It was founded in 1966 and named for Massasoit, the Great Sachem of the Wampanoag. Massasoit Community College is accredited by the New England Commission of Higher Education. It also has campuses in Middleboro and Canton.

Athletics
Massasoit is a member of the NJCAA, in which it has won three national titles: Men's Division II Baseball (1993) and Men's Soccer (1986 and 1987). The college currently offers varsity sports in women's and men's soccer, women's and men's basketball, softball, and baseball. In the past, it has also offered hockey, golf, tennis, and women's volleyball programs.

Faculty and staff
There are currently 115 full-time faculty and 518 part-time faculty. 
There are 275 full-time administrators, professionals, clerical and maintenance workers, and 249 part-time staff.
Over 70% of classes are taught by  part-time, adjunct professors.

Notable alumni
Christine E. Canavan (A.S. 1983), member of the Massachusetts House of Representatives (1993–2015)
Jim Craig, member of the "Miracle on Ice" USA Hockey team in the 1980 Winter Olympics, and NHL player from 1979 to 1984. Transferred to Boston University after his freshman year.
Alex Karalexis, soccer player; professional MMA fighter
Thomas P. Kennedy, Massachusetts state legislator
Jim Mann, Major League Baseball player, 2000–2003
John Murphy, assistant coach of the Major League Soccer teams New England Revolution, Columbus Crew and Colorado Rapids
Kerry O'Neil, (A.S. 2015) Westfield State University (B.S. 2018) (MASCAC) Women's Track and Field 10k Champion 2017. (MASCAC) All conference team cross country 2017, 2018.

See also
List of colleges and universities
List of colleges and universities in Massachusetts
Massasoit Police

References

External links

 
1966 establishments in Massachusetts
Buildings and structures in Brockton, Massachusetts
Buildings and structures in Canton, Massachusetts
Community colleges in Massachusetts
Educational institutions established in 1966
NJCAA athletics
Universities and colleges in Norfolk County, Massachusetts
Universities and colleges in Plymouth County, Massachusetts